Chan Kwok Fai, also known as Tedd Chan, (Pha̍k-fa-sṳ: Tsên Ket-fùn) is a Malaysian Singer born in Ipoh, Malaysia. He is the winner of Astro Talent Quest 2005 (Malaysia Astro Singing Competition).

References

External links
Official Fans Club
Blog
 Tedd Chan Album Lyrics
 All about Tedd Chan

1982 births
Living people
Malaysian people of Hakka descent
Malaysian Mandopop singers
Malaysian male pop singers
People from Perak
Hakka musicians